Eshratabad (also Romanized as ‘Eshratābād) is a village in Zahray-ye Pain Rural District, in the Central District of Buin Zahra County, Qazvin Province, Iran. At the 2006 census, its population was 312, in 75 families.

References 

Populated places in Buin Zahra County